Ramona Convent Secondary School is a private, Catholic, college preparatory school for girls grades 9–12, located in Alhambra, a suburb of Los Angeles, California. Sponsored by the Sisters of the Holy Names of Jesus and Mary. Established in 1889, Ramona is one of the oldest continually operating schools in the same location in California. Today, more than 7,000 alumnae located throughout the world serve their communities both professionally and personally. Ramona is fully accredited by the Western Association of Schools and Colleges,  the Western Catholic Education Association and was a U.S. Department of Education Blue Ribbon School of Excellence recipient in 1993 and 1998. Ramona was voted "Best Catholic School" in the San Gabriel Valley Readers' Choice Awards in 2018 and again in 2019.

High school program
99–100% of Ramona graduates enter college directly after graduation. Ramona offers a rigorous and personalized college-prep program with a wide array of Advanced Placement, Honors, Arts, STEM (Science, Technology, Engineering, and Math), and elective courses, including the AP Capstone Program with its emphasis on college-level  research, writing, and presentation skills and AP Computer Science Principles. Principles of social justice, service, and leadership are infused throughout the program.

History
Ramona Convent Secondary School's first building was dedicated at Ramona Acres, on January 29, 1890 on the expansive property that was later called Shorb, and is now part of the City of Alhambra. The Sisters of the Holy Names of Jesus and Mary came from Oakland, California at the request of several prominent San Gabriel Valley families interested in the Catholic education of their daughters. 

The first building to be built was a four-story red brick building on the knoll that dominated the Convent grounds. The dedication ceremony was presided over by the Right Reverend Bishop Mora of Los Angeles on January 29, 1890. The first commencement exercises were held on June 23, 1891. The groundbreaking ceremony for the major part of the school, took place April 18, 1910. In 1939,  were sold to the State of California for the San Bernardino Freeway (Interstate 10).

In 1967 a Master building plan was developed and implemented, first adding the library with computer and language labs in 1967. Approximately  of the southwestern section of Ramona's property were sold In 1979 in order to help fund further implementation of the Master Plan. Due to extensive damage caused by the October 1, 1987 Whittier Narrows earthquake, the main buildings built between 1889–1912 were demolished.  A building to house administrative offices, kitchen and dining facilities, and a chapel was dedicated on November 12, 1989, the beginning of Ramona's second century. The Marie Rose Science Center was opened in 2008, and the MakerSpace was opened in 2015. Ramona received Blue Ribbon School of Excellence status from the U.S. Department of Education in 1993 and again in 1998.

Co-curricular activities
More than 30 clubs and student organizations are offered including the California Scholarship Federation, the National Honor Society, the International Cultural Society, Interact, the International Thespian Society, the Peace and Justice Society, the Art Club, the Science Club, Book Buddies, and others.

Theater, music, and dance performances are presented throughout the year. Ramona's FIRST Robotics Competition team, one of only a few all-girl teams in competition, is sponsored by Northrop Grumman, Caltech, SpaceX and generous benefactors.  As a member of the Sisters of the Holy Names of Jesus and Mary School Network of Schools, Ramona students participate in the Youth Justice Forum, a solutions-oriented youth conference that includes high school students from the United States, Canada, and Africa.

Ramona athletes complete on 13 teams in seven sports: basketball, cross country,  soccer, softball, swimming, track & field, and volleyball, in the Horizon League under the California Interscholastic Federation.

Notable alumni

Lucille Roybal-Allard, Member of US House of Representatives from California.
Loretta Young, Academy Award-winning actress of film and television.
Marisa Ramirez, American actress
Melissa Villaseñor, American actress, stand-up comedian, and impressionist.
Miss Cleo

See also

Notes and references

External links
Ramona Convent Secondary School Website

Educational institutions established in 1889
Girls' schools in California
Roman Catholic secondary schools in Los Angeles County, California
1889 establishments in California
Alhambra, California
Sisters of the Holy Names of Jesus and Mary
Catholic secondary schools in California